Dragon's Greatest Hits Volume 1 is the first greatest hits album by New Zealand group Dragon, released in April 1979 through CBS Records. It includes tracks from the band's three CBS/Portrait albums, Sunshine, Running Free and O Zambezi, as well as three non-album tracks; "Wait Until Tomorrow", "Konkaroo" and "The Dreaded Moroczy Bind". Dragon's Greatest Hits Vol. 1 peaked at number 8 on the Australian Kent Music Report.

Track listing 
 "Wait Until Tomorrow" (Robert Taylor) – 3:25 
 "This Time" (Marc Hunter, Neil Storey, Paul Hewson; Robert Taylor, Todd Hunter) – 3:10
 "Get that Jive" (Paul Hewson) – 2:45
 "Sunshine" (Paul Hewson) – 4:53
 "Konkaroo" (Paul Hewson) – 3:26
 "April Sun in Cuba" (Marc Hunter, Paul Hewson) – 3:27
 "Shooting Stars" (Paul Hewson) – 3:31
 "Are You Old Enough?" (Paul Hewson) – 4:08 
 "Still in Love With You" (Paul Hewson) – 3:26
 "The Dreaded Moroczy Bind" (Marc Hunter, Neil Storey, Paul Hewson; Robert Taylor, Todd Hunter) – 3:25

Charts

Personnel 
 Bass guitar, vocals – Todd Hunter
 Drums – Kerry Jacobson
 Guitar, vocals – Robert Taylor
 Keyboards, vocals – Paul Hewson
 Producer – Peter Dawkins
 Vocals – Marc Hunter

References 

Dragon (band) albums
1979 greatest hits albums
Compilation albums by New Zealand artists
CBS Records compilation albums
Portrait Records compilation albums
Albums produced by Peter Dawkins (musician)